Kiilinik High School is a grades 7 to 12 school located in Cambridge Bay, Nunavut, Canada. The school serves not only the local hamlet but also the communities of Bathurst Inlet and Umingmaktok should the need arise. At one time a hostel was available for Bathurst Inlet area students but due to families moving to Cambridge Bay it was repurposed.

The current building was opened in 2002 after the previous building was destroyed in a fire in 1998.

The school includes a school and community gym for which $70,000 was raised to ensure a full sized gym was built. The schools library also includes the May Hakongak Public Library and Kitikmeot Heritage Society museum and office area.

References

External links

Kiilinik High School at Taylor Architecture Group

High schools in Nunavut
Kitikmeot Region
Educational institutions in Canada with year of establishment missing